Malfunction Junction is a common nickname for a number of highway interchanges, especially ones that are poorly designed, dangerous, and/or suffer from severe traffic congestion:

 Malfunction Junction, interchange at Interstate 240 and Interstate 55 in Memphis, Tennessee. 
 Malfunction Junction, former interchange configuration at Interstate 20/Interstate 59 and Interstate 65 in Birmingham, Alabama. It was closed for renovation on January 21, 2019
 Malfunction Junction, interchange at Interstate 4 and Interstate 275 in Tampa, Florida
 Malfunction Junction, interchange at Interstate 26 and Interstate 40 in Asheville, North Carolina
 Malfunction Junction, former interchange configuration among Interstate 75, State Route 4 and local streets in Dayton, Ohio
 Malfunction Junction, interchange at Interstate 26 and Interstate 20 near Columbia, South Carolina
 Malfunction Junction, former interchange configuration between Interstate 40 and Interstate 75 adjacent to downtown Knoxville, Tennessee
 Malfunction Junction, former configuration of the Tom Moreland Interchange near Atlanta, Georgia
 Malfunction Junction, interchange at I-565 and Memorial Parkway in Huntsville, Alabama

See also
 "Conjunction Junction", animated educational short from the Schoolhouse Rock! series, for which the phrase is a play on words
 Dead Man's Curve
 Spaghetti junction

Road interchanges in the United States